The 2022 season for  is the team's 10th season as a UCI WorldTeam and its 18th overall. Dutch health and materials company DSM continues as the title sponsor for the second consecutive year, but the team returns to having a Dutch registration for the first season since 2014 after seven years with a German registration. They use Scott bicycles, Shimano drivetrain, Shimano wheels and Craft clothing.

Team roster 

Riders who joined the team for the 2022 season

Riders who left the team during or after the 2021 season

Season victories

National, Continental, and World Champions

Notes

References

External links 

 

Team DSM men
2022
Team DSM men